James Peter Tanguay (May 24, 1909 – March 23, 1971) was an American football tailback who played one season with the Pittsburgh Pirates of the National Football League. He played college football at New York University and attended Central High School in Washington, D.C.

References

External links
Just Sports Stats

1909 births
1971 deaths
Players of American football from Syracuse, New York
American football running backs
NYU Violets football players
Pittsburgh Pirates (football) players